Solobacterium is a Gram-positive, obligate anaerobic genus from the family of Erysipelotrichidae, with one known species (Solobacterium moorei). This genus has been found to be part of the salivary microbiome.

References

Further reading 
 
 
 

Erysipelotrichia
Monotypic bacteria genera
Bacteria genera